Portugal was represented by Carlos do Carmo, with the song "Uma flor de verde pinho", at the 1976 Eurovision Song Contest, which took place on 3 April in The Hague. "Uma flor de verde pinho" was chosen as the Portuguese entry at the Grande Prémio TV da Canção Portuguesa on 7 March.

Before Eurovision

Festival da Canção 1976
The Festival da Canção 1976 was held at the Lumiar studios of the Radio and Television of Portugal in Lisbon, hosted by António Vitorino de Almeida, Ana Zanatti and Eládio Clímaco. Eight songs took part in the final. Thilo Krasmann conducted all the songs.

For the first time, only one singer was chosen to perform all the songs: Carlos do Carmo, a highly respected fado singer, was invited to perform the eight songs, chosen by public contest.

The voting system was once again changed: for the first time, the public was invited to participate on the choice, casting votes on postcards via post until 3 March. On 22 February, the eight compositions were presented to the general public, on RTP1 and on the 23 on RTP2, although the respective authors and composers were not yet known. On 7 March and after the votes of the Portuguese people were scrutinized, the eight songs are again presented from 8th to 1st place, where the authors of each theme and the percentage of votes obtained for each song were revealed.

At Eurovision 
On the night of the final, Carmo performed 15th in the running order, following Austria and preceding Monaco. At the close of the voting the song had received 24 points, coming 12th in the field of 18 competing countries. The orchestra during the Portuguese entry was conducted by Thilo Krasmann.

Voting

References 

1976
Countries in the Eurovision Song Contest 1976
Eurovision